32 Canadian Brigade Group (32CBG) of the Canadian Army is part of the 4th Canadian Division. It is centred on the Greater Toronto Area, as well as Niagara Region and Brantford. It is headquartered at LCol George Taylor Denison III Armoury in Toronto, Ontario.

Brigade Command
Colonel Daniel Stepaniuk, CD, is the Commander of 32 CBG whilst Chief Warrant Officer David Turnbull, CD, is the Brigade Sergeant-Major. Brigade Headquarters has a staff of approximately 40 full-time and 20 part-time members, both military (Regular and Reserve) and civilian.

History

Second World War
32nd (Reserve) Brigade Group was created, within 2 Militia District, on 1 April 1942 when the reserve force in Canada was reorganized for the war.  Like today, the formation consisted of part-time soldiers who paraded and trained on evenings and weekends.  The brigade group was closed down on 30 January 1946 and the headquarters itself closed on 2 April 1946. During its existence, the brigade group was headquartered in Toronto and it held the following organization:

Canadian Infantry Corps
2nd (Reserve) Battalion, The Royal Regiment of Canada
2nd (Reserve) Battalion, 48th Highlanders of Canada
2nd (Reserve) Battalion, The Irish Regiment of Canada
2nd (Reserve) Battalion, The Toronto Scottish Regiment (MG)
Canadian Armoured Corps
11th (Reserve) Armoured Regiment (Ontario Regiment)
Royal Canadian Artillery
32nd (Reserve) Field Regiment, RCA
Royal Canadian Engineers
2nd (Reserve) Field Company, RCE
Royal Canadian Army Service Corps
Brigade Group Company, 2nd (Reserve) Divisional, RCASC
Royal Canadian Army Medical Corps
No.2 (Reserve) Field Ambulance, RCAMC
Royal Canadian Corps of Signals
E Section, A (Reserve) Corps Signals, RCCS
J Section, 2nd (Reserve) Divisional Signals, RCCS
Royal Canadian Ordnance Corps / Royal Canadian Electrical and Mechanical Engineers
No.2 Group, No.1 (Reserve) Divisional Workshop, (RCOC) RCEME
No.5 (Reserve) Light Aid Detachment, (RCOC) RCEME
No.6 (Reserve) Light Aid Detachment, (RCOC) RCEME
No.7 (Reserve) Light Aid Detachment, (RCOC) RCEME
No.8 (Reserve) Light Aid Detachment, (RCOC) RCEME

1997 to Present

32 Canadian Brigade Group (CBG) was recreated on 1 April 1997, with its headquarters located in Toronto, replacing the Toronto District Headquarters. Resulting from a major restructuring of the army, it was established as one of ten reserve brigade groups organized across Canada.

Although 32 CBG has a short history, this cannot be said of its units. Regiments like The 48th Highlanders of Canada, The Governor General's Horse Guards, The Queen's Own Rifles of Canada, The Queen's York Rangers, The Royal Regiment of Canada, The Lorne Scots, and The Lincoln and Welland Regiment were all founded before Confederation. Most units have served in almost all of the military campaigns involving Canadians: Fenian raids, Red River Expedition, North-West Rebellion, South African War, both World Wars and the Korean War. Since the 1980s, they have been contributing to UN and NATO missions around the world.

Many soldiers of 32 Canadian Brigade Group have served on operations around the world. Nearly 70 members of the brigade deployed to Afghanistan in August 2006 and more than 120 served in Kandahar during the winter of 2008–2009. The brigade has also played a big role in disaster relief at home, helping Canadians during the Manitoba floods and the January 1998 ice storm. It remains prepared to back up the emergency services of the Greater Toronto Area and Central Ontario whenever needed.

Role
The role of 32 CBG is to produce well-trained Reserve soldiers to enhance Canada's combat capability. Like all Reserve brigades and units, it trains part-time soldiers to serve as the basis of national mobilization, to respond to emergencies in Canada and to augment the Regular Force overseas, and to be the army's link to the community.

32 CBG comprises part-time soldiers plus a small cadre from the Regular Force who help plan and execute the training. Soldiers of the Army Reserve ― traditionally, the Militia ― train an average of one night a week and one weekend a month. Many Reservists train full-time during the summer, because many of the younger soldiers are students.

Brigade composition

Overview
32 CBG is an infantry-heavy brigade with 2100 soldiers in 10 units based in Toronto, Aurora, Brantford, Scarborough, St. Catharines, Brampton, Oakville, Georgetown and Mississauga. It has two reconnaissance regiments, two field artillery regiments, a field engineer regiment and six infantry battalions. The brigade recently added two new, temporary armouries. The Queen's Own Rifles now have an infantry company in Scarborough, while the Toronto Scottish have established a company in Mississauga.

Regiments

Armouries

In the Canadian Forces, an armoury is a place where a reserve unit trains, meets, and parades.

See also

 List of armouries in Canada
 Military history of Canada
 History of the Canadian Army
 Canadian Forces

References

External links
Official Brigade Website

Brigades of the Canadian Army
Military units and formations of Canada in World War II